Green Balloon Club is a British children's factual television program that started on CBeebies on 20 June 2008.

Format
Green Balloon Club focuses on the adventures of four children - Jay, Cat, Lilly-Rose and Ant, as they travel throughout the United Kingdom on a green hot-air balloon led by balloonist Sky and Cat's dog Skipper. During their travels, they look out for other Green Balloon Club members and have a look at what wildlife they have in their patch. Each episode starts with the children doing the register, then joining in with the "Green Balloon Club" chant. At the end of the show, the balloon "lands" and everybody sings one of several songs.

Other BBC personalities appear on the show, with the puppet Jelly from The Story Makers and CBeebies Springwatch appearing as a special reporter, and fellow BBC presenters Chris Howard and Bill Oddie.

Cast

Green Team/Main
The cast members on the show were all ordinary children all found at extensive auditions.
Debbie Korley as Sky, the balloonist of the Green Team who leads the group on various adventures. She was replaced with Chris Howard near the end of the series' main run, and in the Green Balloon Club Goes on Holiday spin-off, but later returned in the Winter Special.
Isabella Blake-Thomas as Lily Rose, the flower expert of the Green Team. She is the youngest of the children (her actress was only five at the time of the production), and sometimes can be a bit self-centred.
Jake Pratt as Jay, the bird expert of the Green Team. He can be quite a jokester at times. He didn't appear in one episode, and didn't appear for the Green Balloon Club Goes on Holiday spin-off, but later returned for the Winter Special.
Adam Wells as Ant, the bug expert of the Green Team.
Thai Murray-Edwards as Cat, the animal expert of the Green Team and the owner of Skipper.
Skipper the Dog as herself, the canine companion of the Green Team. She was the real-life pet of Cat's actress Thai Murray-Edwards. Skipper's sounds are done through stock sound effects.

Recurring
Aliex Yuill as Jelly, a green puppet who is one of the Story Makers. She normally appears in episodes as a Special Reporter (reprising this role from CBeebies Springwatch and CBeebies Autumnwatch) or is with Bill Oddie in his garden.
Chris Howard, a presenter from Springwatch and Autumnwatch, also appeared in CBeebies Springwatch and CBeebies Autumnwatch. He normally appears with other children as the leader of the Ground Crew, but near the end of the show's run became the Pilot of the balloon going by the name "Nature Chris", replacing Debbie Korley.
Bill Oddie, another BBC nature presenter. He appears in some episodes alongside Jelly, where they look at the different kinds of nature around his garden.

Songs 
The series also has a major focus on music and singing, and every episode features an originally-written song performed by the main cast. All of the songs were written by Paul Moessl.
Theme Song
Let's Go Play Outside
It's Our World
Listen
All Earth's Creatures
Underwater
Fun on the Beach
Minibeast Madness
Flying
Whatever's Good at Christmas (written by Bill Oddie and produced by Paul Moessl, was released as a single)
Dig In
Good to get away (Arran song)
At the Zoo (Belfast song)
Animal Alphabet,
Waggle Dance
It's a Dog's Life
and a final special arrangement of the Title song for the Winter Special

Development
The program was conceived and made by Clare Bradley, Lotte Elwell and the CBeebies Production team, and grew out of their previous award-winning work on CBeebies Springwatch and Autumnwatch.

Episodes

Green Balloon Club (2008–2009)
Green Balloon Club was produced as part of CBeebies' "EcoBeebies" brand. It started with a launch show named Easy Peasy Eco Beebies on 13 June 2008, and this was followed by 48 episodes, one every week from 20 June 2008 to 29 May 2009, although there was a break during the Christmas Holidays.

(Titles sourced from the BBC Australia website (The episodes on the UK BBC website don't have episode titles))

Ratings 
Episode viewing figures from BARB.

Green Balloon Club Goes on Holiday (2009)
In 2009, a stand-alone series of 10 episodes were broadcast. The first half featured the Green Team visiting the Isle of Arran and the second half featured the Green Team becoming zookeepers in Belfast Zoo for a week.

Winter Special (2009)
A stand-alone Winter Special was aired in December 2009 (Recorded in November 2009), which featured the entire cast going on a winter camping adventure.

Green Balloon Club Scrapbook (2010)
In 2010, a spin-off series of 15 episodes entitled "Green Balloon Club Scrapbook" was produced which showed "what the Green Team get up to when they're not in the Green Balloon. Different members of the team check the laptop to find out what the other members of the Green Balloon Club are getting up to". This series also included animated segments starring Skipper the Dog, who in this series gained a voice. This series also included two song specials.
"

Note: episode 13 was not shown between episodes 12 and 14, as it was shown within the Christmas schedule

International airings
 The show began airing in Australia on their version of CBeebies in late 2009, in time for the summer season. Until 2019, the show still aired on the channel, in a late-night slot.
 The show also aired on CBeebies Poland from 2010 to 2013, titled Podróże z Zielonym Balonem ("Travel with the Green Balloon") and dubbed into Polish by now-defunct dubbing company Eurocom Studio.

References

External links
 

BBC children's television shows
British television shows featuring puppetry
2008 British television series debuts
2009 British television series endings
2000s British children's television series
CBeebies
British preschool education television series
2000s preschool education television series
Television series about children
Television series by BBC Studios